The 1952–53 Boston Bruins season was the Bruins' 29th season in the National Hockey League (NHL).

Offseason

Regular season

Final standings

Record vs. opponents

Schedule and results

Playoffs

Player statistics

Regular season
Scoring

Goaltending

Playoffs
Scoring

Goaltending

Awards and records

Awards

The Boston Bruins did not win any NHL awards for the 1952-53 NHL season.

All-Star teams

Transactions
The following is a list of all transactions that have occurred for the Boston Bruins during the 1952–53 NHL season. It lists which team each player has been traded to and for which player(s) or other consideration(s), if applicable.

See also
1952–53 NHL season

References

External links

Boston Bruins season, 1952-53
Boston Bruins season, 1952-53
Boston Bruins seasons
Boston
Boston
1950s in Boston